Vanesa Gottifredi (born 13 November 1969) is an Argentine chemist and biologist. She works as a researcher in the Principal Investigator category of the Scientific and Technological Researcher Program (CICT) of the National Scientific and Technical Research Council (CONICET). She is also head of the Leloir Institute's Cell Cycle and Genomic Stability Laboratory. She specializes in the mechanisms of tumor cell response to chemotherapy, work for which she was awarded by the Alexander von Humboldt Foundation and L'Oreal-UNESCO.

Career
Vanesa Gottifredi completed her undergraduate studies at the National University of Salta, where she obtained a licentiate in chemistry in 1992. She then studied at the Sapienza University of Rome, where she graduated as a doctor in human biology in 1998. Later she conducted postdoctoral studies in cell biology and cancer at Columbia University in the United States.

As head of the Cell Cycle and Genomic Stability Laboratory at the Leloir Institute Foundation, she conducts research on defense mechanisms that both normal and tumor cells use to cope with adverse events, and how malignant cells avoid the effects of chemotherapy.

Awards
 Special mention for the Lóreál-UNESCO Award, 2013
 Bernardo Houssay Award for Medical Science, 2014
 Friedrich Wilhelm Bessel Award from the Alexander von Humboldt Foundation, 2017
 Ben Barres Spotlight Award from eLife, 2019
 L'Oréal-UNESCO For Women in Science Award (Argentine national edition), in collaboration with CONICET, 2019

References

External links
 Vanesa Gottifredi at the Leloir Institute

1969 births
Argentine biologists
Argentine chemists
Argentine women scientists
Living people
People from Salta Province
Sapienza University of Rome alumni
Women biologists
Women chemists